The Coral Gables Congregational Church is a historic Congregational church in Coral Gables, Florida, United States. The church was designed by the architect Richard Kiehnel of Kiehnel and Elliott in 1923 and is regarded as a fine example of Spanish Colonial Revival architecture. It is located at 3010 DeSoto Boulevard. On October 10, 1978, it was added to the U.S. National Register of Historic Places.

It has been known to encourage artistic and musical pursuits for youths. In particular the Coral Gables Congregational Church Composition Prize which, in 2006, was won by Australian composer Gordon Hamilton.

History
The land for the church was donated by George E. Merrick, the developer who planned and built Coral Gables. Merrick dedicated it to his father, a Congregational minister.

See also
 Church of the Little Flower (Coral Gables, Florida)

References

External links

 Official church website
 Dade County listings at National Register of Historic Places
 Florida's Office of Cultural and Historical Programs
 Dade County listings
 Coral Gables Congregational Church

United Church of Christ churches in Florida
National Register of Historic Places in Miami-Dade County, Florida
Churches on the National Register of Historic Places in Florida
Churches in Miami-Dade County, Florida
Kiehnel and Elliott buildings
Spanish Colonial Revival architecture in Florida
1923 establishments in Florida
Churches completed in 1923
Buildings and structures in Coral Gables, Florida